Marco Aurélio Siqueira (born 4 June 1970), known as Marco Aurélio, is a Brazilian retired footballer who played as a goalkeeper.

Most of his career was spent in Portugal, where he appeared in more than 300 official games in 11 seasons (ten in the top division) in representation of three clubs, notably Belenenses.

Football career
Marco Aurélio was born in Ribeirão Preto, São Paulo. He started his career with lowly Clube Náutico Capibaribe and Santa Cruz Futebol Clube, moving in 1996 to Portugal with Rio Ave FC.

After only four months Aurélio joined fellow first division side S.C. Farense, signing with Lisbon's C.F. Os Belenenses after one 1/2 seasons, helping it return to the top flight in his first year and going on to amass more than 300 official appearances. In the 2002–03 campaign his solid performances earned the club a comfortable mid-table position, and he was also named the Goalkeeper of the Year.

In six consecutive seasons, Aurélio only missed three league games for Belenenses combined. In 2007, however, after having lost his position to Paulo Costinha and often being as low as third-choice, he retired from professional football aged 37.

References

External links
Brazilian FA database 

1970 births
Living people
People from Ribeirão Preto
Brazilian footballers
Association football goalkeepers
Campeonato Brasileiro Série A players
Clube Náutico Capibaribe players
Santa Cruz Futebol Clube players
Primeira Liga players
Liga Portugal 2 players
Rio Ave F.C. players
S.C. Farense players
C.F. Os Belenenses players
Brazilian expatriate footballers
Expatriate footballers in Portugal
Brazilian expatriate sportspeople in Portugal
Footballers from São Paulo (state)